Gilsa may refer to:

 Gilsa (Schwalm), a river of Hesse, Germany, tributary of the Schwalm
 Leopold von Gilsa (died 1870), career soldier who served in the armies of Prussia and the United States
 Werner von Gilsa (1889–1945), German general during World War II